Aayiram Nilave Vaa is a 1983 Indian Tamil-language film directed by A. S. Prakasam. The film stars Karthik and Sulakshana. It was released on 15 July 1983.

Plot 

The story centres around Chandhar who is the manager of an estate in Ooty. He also moonlights as a writer of stories for a popular magazine and has a big fan following. Nagesh plays a guest at this estate. Soon, he gets another guest in the form of Devi, who pretends to be blind and has a backstory to this. She is also his biggest fan and has been proposed to by Chandhar via their fan letters to one another.

Love soon blossoms between the two and just as things come together, in comes Suri who is the identical twin of the manager. Suri was adopted by the owner of the estate and so he feels neglected by his own family. This makes Suri binge on booze and other bad habits. He and Chandhar are not in good terms and are complete opposites in character. One day, both of them get into a fist-fight over Devi and somehow Suri dies. What happens next?

Cast 
 Karthik as Chandhar and Suri
 Sulakshana as Devi
 Silk Smitha
 Nagesh

Soundtrack 
The music was composed by Maestro Ilaiyaraaja, while the lyrics were written by Vairamuthu, Pulamaipithan and Gangai Amaran. This was Ilaiyaraaja's 200th film as composer. The song "Devathai Ilam" was reused from song "Kelade Nimageega", which Ilaiyaraaja had composed for the Kannada film Geetha while the song "Andharangam Yavume" was later reused as "Manchu Kurise" in the Telugu film Abhinandana, also starring Karthik.

Reception 
Jayamanmadhan of Kalki felt the good suspense could have been handled briskly but the story struggles heavily in the hands of Prakasam.

References

External links 
 

1980s Tamil-language films
1983 films
Films scored by Ilaiyaraaja